Kleenex is a brand name for a line of paper-based facial tissues. Often used informally as a genericized trademark for facial tissue, the name Kleenex is currently a registered trademark of Kimberly-Clark. Kleenex products are manufactured in 78 countries and sold in more than 196 countries.

History
Kleenex began during the First World War when the Cellucotton company developed a crepe paper gas mask filter. In the 1920s, the product was modified into the feminine hygiene pad Kotex. A further modification of the original crepe paper made it thinner and softer, and the resultant 1924 product was called "Kleenex" and marketed as a cold cream remover.   In line with the company's requirements for their brand names to be short, easy to say, and easy to explain, the name Kleenex was selected as the "Kleen" portion of the name denotes its cleansing purpose. The "ex" was added to show that Kleenex was of the family of products that included Kotex. This was the first marketing of a disposable paper-based facial tissue in the western world, and was sold as a substitute for face towels or cotton wool. In 1925, the first Kleenex tissue ad was used in magazines showing "the new secret of keeping a pretty skin as used by famous movie stars." A few years after the introduction of Kleenex, the Cellucotton's head researcher tried to persuade the head of advertising to try to market the tissue for colds and hay fever. The administrator declined the idea but then committed a small amount of ad space to mention of using Kleenex tissue as a handkerchief. By the 1930s, Kleenex was being marketed with the slogan "Don’t Carry a Cold in Your Pocket" and its use as a disposable handkerchief replacement became predominant. In 1943, Kleenex began licensing the Little Lulu cartoon character to popularize the brand.

Kleenex trademark
The original Kleenex trademark application at the United States Patent and Trademark Office (USPTO) was filed in the class of Medical, Beauty, & Agricultural Services by Cellucotton Products Company of Neenah, Wisconsin, on Saturday July 12, 1924. The description provided to the USPTO was "absorbent pads or sheets for removing cold cream."

The first use for the drawing and stylized word mark in commerce was on June 12, 1924. USPTO granted trademark registration on November 25, 1924. International Cellucotton Products Company officially assigned trademark interest and good will of the business to Kimberly-Clark Corporation on September 30, 1955. Kimberly-Clark Corporation of Neenah, Wisconsin is the current registered owner of the Kleenex trademark.

In the US, the Kleenex name has become - in common usage but not in law - genericized. The popularity of the product has led to the use of its name to refer to any facial tissue, regardless of the brand. Many dictionaries, including Merriam-Webster and Oxford, now include definitions in their publications defining it as such.

See also
 Man of Steel, Woman of Kleenex

References

Further reading

External links 

 Official website
 Kleenex History Timeline
 Gallery of vintage graphic design featuring Kleenex tissues

Products introduced in 1924
Brands that became generic
Kimberly-Clark brands
Paper products
Personal care brands